Ulick Burke (de Burgh) of Umhaill (died 1343) was the son of Richard an Forbair de Burke, and grandson of William Liath de Burgh (Burke).

Family
He is the ancestor of the Bourkes of the Owles, in County Mayo, as well as being the person after whom the MacUlick Burkes (anglicized Gillick) were named.  He is sometimes confused with his uncle, Ulick Burke of Annaghkeen.

References

1343 deaths
People from County Mayo
14th-century Irish people
Ulick
Year of birth unknown